The 2019 USA Rugby League season is the 22nd season overall of semi-professional rugby league competition in the United States and the 8th season under the governance of the USARL.

Teams

2019 Season Ladder 

 * Philadelphia Fight two competition point deduction for forfeit to Northern Virginia Eagles in week 8
 ** Southwest Florida Copperheads two competition point deduction for playing unregistered players in week 1 and week 5, and forfeit to Axemen in week 6 (-6 total)
 *** Atlanta Rhinos two competition point deduction for forfeit to Southwest Florida Copperheads in week 8.
Week 3 match between Atlanta Rhinos and Southwest Florida Copperheads in Atlanta cancelled due to weather
Week 7 match between Lakeland Renegades and Jacksonville Axemen in Lakeland Renegades cancelled due to weather
Week 8 match between Tampa Mayhem and Southwest Florida Copperheads in Tampa cancelled due to weather

Results

Round 1

 Southwest Florida Copperheads fielded unregistered players and have lost two competition points.

Round 2

Round 3 

 *Game was abandoned due to bad weather. No word yet if the game will be replayed at a later date.

Round 4

Round 5

 Southwest Florida Copperheads fielded unregistered players and have lost two competition points.

Round 6 

 *Southwest Florida Copperheads could not travel due to bad weather in Florida and have therefore forfeited the game. The rules are if a team forfeits a game, they lose 30-0. They also lost two competition points.

Round 7

 *Game cancelled due to bad weather. No word yet if the game will be rescheduled.

Round 8

 *Atlanta Rhinos forfeited the game. The rules state that if a team forfeits a game, they lose 30-0. They also lost 2 competition points.
 *Philadelphia Fight forfeited the game against Northern Virginia Eagles and lost two competition points

Round 9

 *Tampa Mayhem and Southwest Florida Copperheads game cancelled due to bad weather

Round 10

Conference Semi-finals

 * Atlanta Rhinos withdraw from the playoffs due to inability to field a side. Southwest Florida Copperheads took their place.
Northern Virginia Eagles forfeited the game against Brooklyn Kings.

Conference Championships

With the wins, Jacksonville Axemen are the Champions of the Southern Conference and the Brooklyn Kings are the Champions of the Northern Conference.

National Championship

Representative Game

Representative Game

References

2019 in rugby league
USA Rugby League
Seasons in American rugby league